Celosia trigyna is a plant species commonly known as woolflower for its curious flowers.

Description
Celosia trigyna may grow up to 1 m (3 feet) in height and is considered a weed in some regions of the world where it is introduced. It can be grown from seed.

Use
During drought, woolflower has been used as a source of food.

It is also eaten as a vegetable in Africa.

References

External links
 PROTAbase on Celosia trigyna
Celosia trigyna
Use as food in Africa

trigyna
Leaf vegetables
African cuisine